The Ithaca Bombers football team represents Ithaca College in college football at the NCAA Division III level. The Bombers are members of the Liberty League, fielding its team in the Liberty League since 2017. The Bombers play their home games at Butterfield Stadium in Ithaca, New York. 

Their head coach is Michael Toerper, who took over the position for the 2022 season.

Conference affiliations
 Independent College Athletic Conference (1971–1990; rebranded)
 Empire Athletic Association (1991–1999; rebranded)
 Empire 8 (2000–2016)
 Liberty League (2017–present)

List of head coaches

Key

Coaches

Year-by-year results

Notes

References

External links
 

 
American football teams established in 1930
1930 establishments in New York (state)